Arua Regional Cancer Centre (ARCC) is a public, specialized, tertiary care medical facility owned by the Uganda Ministry of Health. The facility is located off of Weatherhead Lane, in the central business district of the city of Arua, on the campus of Arua Regional Referral Hospital. The coordinates of the cancer centre are: 03°01'06.0"N, 30°54'50.0"E (Latitude:3.018345; Longitude:30.913889).

It is expected, at a later date, to construct a standalone regional cancer centre in Arua.

Overview
ARCC is a cancer treatment, research, and teaching center, affiliated with the Muni University and with the Arua Regional Referral Hospital. ARCC was founded in 2017, according to the Uganda Ministry of Health. , ARCC is housed on the premises of Arua Regional Referral Hospital.

The establishment of the centre came about as a result of the increased patient burden at Uganda Cancer Institute, where 4,500 to 6,000 new patients are registered annually. Other regional cancer centers established in this effort include Mbarara Regional Cancer Centre, Gulu Regional Cancer Centre and Mbale Regional Cancer Centre.

Collaboration
The cancer centre works in collaboration with Uganda Cancer Institute (UCI), the leading cancer treatment and research institute in Uganda, which is under transformation into the East African Cancer Centre of Excellence. UCI specialists work together with Arua Regional Referral Hospital staff to provide the necessary oncology care.

See also
 Hospitals in Uganda

References

External links

Medical research institutes in Uganda
2017 establishments in Uganda
Hospitals in Uganda
Cancer organisations based in Uganda
Arua